BJ4 is the fourth album by jazz pianist Bob James. Released in 1977, the album charted at number three on the Jazz Album Charts. This would be his last CTI album before starting his label Tappan Zee Records, named for one of the tracks on this album.

Track listing
All tracks composed by Bob James; except where noted.
"Pure Imagination" (Leslie Bricusse, Anthony Newley) – 5:20
"Where the Wind Blows Free" – 6:43
"Tappan Zee" – 6:49
"Nights Are Forever Without You" (Parker McGee) – 6:23
"Treasure Island" – 6:10
"El Verano" – 4:55

Personnel 
 Bob James – acoustic piano, Fender Rhodes, clavinet, ARP Odyssey, Oberheim polyphonic synthesizer, arrangements
 Eric Gale – guitars
 Gary King – bass
 Steve Gadd – drums
 Ralph MacDonald – percussion

Brass and Woodwinds
 Eddie Daniels – tenor saxophone, clarinet, flute
 Romeo Penque – tenor saxophone, bass clarinet, tenor recorder 
 Hubert Laws – flute, alto flute
 George Marge – alto recorder 
 Sidney Weinberg – oboe, English horn
 Art Farmer – trumpet, flugelhorn
 John Frosk – trumpet
 John Gatchell – trumpet

Strings
 Charles McCracken – cello
 Alan Shulman  – cello
 Lamar Alsop – viola
 Emanuel Vardi – viola
 Max Ellen – violin
 Paul Gershman – violin
 Harry Glickman – violin
 Emanuel Green – violin
 Harold Kohon – violin
 Charles Libove – violin
 David Nadien – violin
 Matthew Raimondi – violin

Production 
 Creed Taylor – producer 
 Rudy Van Gelder – engineer
 Sib Chalawick – album design 
 Carole Kowalchuck – album design
 Wendie Lombardi – cover photography 
 White Gate Art Company – liner photography

Charts

External links
 Bob James-BJ4 at Discogs

References 

1977 albums
Bob James (musician) albums
CTI Records albums
Albums produced by Creed Taylor
Albums recorded at Van Gelder Studio